Jacques Lamblin (born August 29, 1952 in Nancy) is a member of the National Assembly of France.  He represents the Meurthe-et-Moselle department,  and is a member of the Union for a Popular Movement.

References

1952 births
Living people
Politicians from Nancy, France
Rally for the Republic politicians
Union for a Popular Movement politicians
Gaullism, a way forward for France
Deputies of the 13th National Assembly of the French Fifth Republic
Deputies of the 14th National Assembly of the French Fifth Republic